Samuel Colt (1814–1862), was an American inventor and industrialist.

Samuel Colt may also refer to:

Samuel P. Colt (1852–1921), American industrialist and politician

See also
Armsmear, also known as Samuel Colt House